Early parliamentary elections were held in Greece on 5 November 1989. The liberal-conservative New Democracy party of Konstantinos Mitsotakis emerged as the largest party in Parliament, defeating PASOK of Andreas Papandreou.  However, as in June 1989, Mitsotakis was unable to form a government since his party had failed to win a majority of seats.

Results

References

1989 11
Greece
Legislative
1989
Greece